Chang Kai-chen was the defending champion, but lost to Nigina Abduraimova in the quarterfinals.

Olga Govortsova won the title, defeating İpek Soylu in the final, 6–1, 6–2.

Seeds

Main draw

Finals

Top half

Bottom half

References 
 Main draw

Zhuhai Open
Zhuhai ITF Women's Pro Circuit - Singles